Calvin Peach is a Canadian former politician. He represented the district of Bellevue in the Newfoundland and Labrador House of Assembly from 2007 until 2015. He is a member of the Progressive Conservatives. His district was redistricted in 2015 and Peach unsuccessfully ran in the new district of Placentia West-Bellevue.

Electoral record

|-

|-

|-

|}

|-

|-
 
|NDP
|Gabe Ryan 
|align="right"|1,356
|align="right"|27.19
|align="right"|
|-

|}

|-

|-

|-

|NDP
|Ian Slade
|align="right"|155 
|align="right"|3.1
|align="right"|

|}

References

External links
 Calvin Peach's PC Party biography

Progressive Conservative Party of Newfoundland and Labrador MHAs
Living people
21st-century Canadian politicians
Year of birth missing (living people)